The Caithness Crushers are a Scottish rugby league team based in Thurso. Formed in 2011 the goal is to compete in Scotland Rugby League's Conference Division 1.

See also 

Rugby league in Scotland
List of rugby league clubs in Britain

References

External links
Caithness Crushers website

Rugby clubs established in 2011
Thurso
Scottish rugby league teams
Sport in Caithness